Ferris Wheel of Paris may refer to:
 Grande Roue de Paris, the 100 metre Ferris wheel built for the Exposition Universelle world exhibition of 1900 and demolished in 1920
 Roue de Paris, the 60 metre transportable Ferris wheel erected on the Place de la Concorde for the year 2000 millennium celebrations